Phyllonorycter dentifera is a moth of the family Gracillariidae. It is known from Central Asia, southern Tajikistan and Turkmenistan.

The larvae feed on Populus pruinosa. They mine the leaves of their host plant. The mines are found only the upperside of the leaf.

References

dentifera
Moths of Asia
Moths described in 1992